Daniel Chamberlain (born August 26, 1937) is a former American football player who played with the Buffalo Bills. He played college football at California State University, Sacramento.

References

1937 births
Living people
Sacramento State Hornets football players
Buffalo Bills players
Players of American football from Grand Rapids, Michigan
American football ends
American Football League players